Volchansk is a town under the administrative jurisdiction of the Town of Karpinsk in Sverdlovsk Oblast, Russia, located on the Volchanka River (a right tributary of the Sosva in the Ob's basin),  north of Yekaterinburg, the administrative center of the oblast. Population:

Geography
The town consists of two parts: Lesnaya Volchanka in the north (or Volchansk proper) and Volchanka in the south.

History
Town status was granted to Volchansk in 1956.

Administrative and municipal status
Within the framework of the administrative divisions, it is, together with ten rural localities, subordinated to the Town of Karpinsk—an administrative unit with the status equal to that of the districts. As a municipal division, Volchansk, together with two rural localities under the administrative jurisdiction of the Town of Karpinsk, is incorporated as Volchansky Urban Okrug. Karpinsk and eight other rural localities are incorporated separately as Karpinsk Urban Okrug.

Economy
factory of consumer goods
dressing mill
brickyard
extraction of brown coal (terminated)
asphalt plant

Transportation

A tram system started operating in Volchansk on December 31, 1951.

References

Notes

Sources

Cities and towns in Sverdlovsk Oblast
Monotowns in Russia